Hugh Algernon Weddell (22 June 1819 – 22 July 1877) was a physician and botanist, specialising in South American flora.

Weddell was born at Birches House, Painswick near Gloucester, England but was raised in France and educated at the Lycée Henri IV, where he received a medical degree in 1841. He had also studied botany and became a respected member of the French botanical fraternity. While studying he accompanied Adrien-Henri de Jussieu (1797-1853) on numerous botanizing expeditions and he became a collaborator with Ernest Cosson (1819-1889) and Jacques Germain de Saint-Pierre (1815-1882) in the preparation of Flore des environs de Paris (1845). In 1843, he was invited to join the expedition of François Louis de la Porte, comte de Castelnau to South America, and he explored and collected botanical specimens on that continent for five years.

In May 1845, Weddell left the expedition which was then in Paraguay, and proceeded on a solitary journey which would take him into Peru and Bolivia. Before leaving Paris, he had been particularly instructed by the Muséum national d'Histoire naturelle to undertake a thorough investigation of the Cinchona plant, or "fever bark" tree in its native habitat. Cinchona, the source of quinine, was of great commercial importance and Europeans had been investigating it for nearly two hundred years with the goal of cultivating it in regions far removed from the Andes mountains. Weddell explored a number of regions where the trees grew and identified no fewer than fifteen distinct species of the genus Cinchona (Rubiaceae). The seeds which he took back to Paris were germinated in the Jardin des Plantes, and the plants were used to establish Cinchona forests in Java and elsewhere in the East Indies.

In 1847 he married Manuela Bolognesi, a resident of Arequipa. By March 1848 he had returned to Paris, leaving his wife in South America.

In Paris, Weddell was given the post of assistant naturalist at the museum.  He held this office until 1853. Weddell made a second trip to South America in 1851.  He returned to France and died on 22 July 1877 in Poitiers, while caring for his father.

Honours
He is commemorated in the names of a number of plants and animals, including the dusky-headed parakeet, Aratinga weddellii (Deville, 1851), the Andean plant Diplostephium weddellii S.F.Blake (Compositae), the South American plant genus of Weddellina Tul., and the catfish Anadoras weddellii (Castelnau 1855).

This botanist is denoted by the author abbreviation Wedd. when citing a botanical name.

Publications
 Histoire naturelle des quinquinas (1849) - monograph describing the Cinchona plant
 Additions à la flore de l’Amérique du Sud (1850) - which gives the history of his first trip to South America.
 Voyage dans la Nord de la Bolivie (1853) - which describes his second trip to South America.
 Chloris andina: essai d’une flore de la region alpine des Cordillères de l’Amérique du Sud (two volumes) (1855-1861) - it constitutes the sixth part of Francis de Castelnau’s Expédition dans les parties centrals de l’Amérique du Sud  (1850-1859).

References

 Rare books from the Missouri Botanical Garden Library: Hugh Algernon Weddell

Botanists with author abbreviations
1819 births
1877 deaths
19th-century French botanists
Quinine
People from Painswick
Lycée Henri-IV alumni